Coco Republic is an Australian furniture retail chain owned by Saveba Pty Ltd. The company is involved in the retail selling of furniture and homewares, providing interior design and property styling services and the management of a design school. The company also owns and co-operates three hospitality venues under L'Americano Espresso Bar.

History and expansion
In 2019, Coco Republic entered the US market through Californian retailer HD Buttercup. Galleries are located at the Helms Avenue flagship in Los Angeles and San Francisco store, in addition to a smaller curated collection at Orange County.

In February 2020, Anthony Spon-Smith became a RH Artisan for US retailer RH.

Locations
Coco Republic has 15 showrooms in Australia and New Zealand. They are located at Sydney, Melbourne, Brisbane, Gold Coast, Canberra, Perth, and Auckland.

Financials
In FY19, the company recorded sales of $96,572,629, up 17% from $82,559,248 in FY18 and a 69% improvement in operating income.

Awards
The Auckland showroom opened in August 2019 won Supreme Winner, Big Box Group Winner and GDM Craftsmanship Excellence Award at the New Zealand Red Awards for commercial design.

Partnerships
The Belle Coco Republic Interior Design Awards, an annual award platform in the Australian interior design community, entered its 10th year in 2020.

See also
 RH (company)

References

External links
 Coco Republic website
 L'Americano website
Furniture retailers of Australia
Australian brands